Roy James Starrak (1928–2013) was a Canadian-born American ice hockey defenseman who played for Colorado College.

Career
Starrak's collegiate career began in 1947 with the Freshman team at Colorado College. He joined the varsity team the following year and promptly became a fixture for the Tigers. Starrak was named to the AHCA First Team All-Americans in each of his three varsity seasons, becoming the first player to achieve that feat. In his junior season Starrak helped CC produce one of the greatest offensive seasons in college hockey history. The Tigers reached the NCAA Tournament for the third consecutive season and ran roughshod over their opponents. Colorado College scored double-digit goals in both games and won the program's first National Championship.

After graduating he worked as a geologist in the oil industry, mostly for Getty Oil. At the time of his retirement he was the Senior Vice President of Production.

Personal life
Jim's older brother Dick Starrak also played college hockey.

Starrak became a US citizen in 1970. He was first married to Jean Pringle, whom he met at Colorado College. They had two sons, Jim and Ward. The marriage to his second wife Evelyn Tucker, lasted from December 1987 until her death in February 2005. Jim then married Jolene Trolinder the following November.

Statistics

Regular season and playoffs

Awards and honors

References

External links
 

1928 births
2013 deaths
Canadian ice hockey defencemen
Ice hockey people from Saskatchewan
Colorado College Tigers men's ice hockey players
Sportspeople from Moose Jaw
NCAA men's ice hockey national champions
AHCA Division I men's ice hockey All-Americans